Joint Operational Support Airlift Center (JOSAC) is the airlift branch of United States Transportation Command (USTRANSCOM). JOSAC specializes in airlift within the continental United States. JOSAC schedules aircraft assigned to the U.S. Air Force, Air National Guard and Reserve, Army National Guard and Army Reserves and the U.S. Marines.

JOSAC is located at Scott Air Force Base in Illinois. JOSAC was stood up in July 1996 to efficiently schedule to Operational Support Airlift assets of the Air Force, Navy, Marines and Army.  Presently there are 80 units in the USA that provide aircraft for JOSAC, providing a fleet of approximately 130 aircraft.  Aircraft utilized include the C-21A, C-12, C-26, UC-35, C-20, C-40, and C-9.

Schedulers receive requests from travel validators via the JALIS database (Joint Air Logistics System), which is an Oracle-based system developed by the US Navy. JOSAC consists of Military and Civilian personnel based at Scott AFB.  JOSAC is run by an Active Duty O6.

There are a number of detachments in various Army National Guards:

References

External links
 Joint Operational Support Airlift (OSA)
 Joint Operational Support Airlift Center
 Operational Support Airlift Activity

Centers of the United States Air Force
Military units and formations in Illinois